A pishtaco is a mythological boogeyman figure in the Andes region of South America, particularly in Peru and Bolivia. Some parts of the Andes refer to the pishtaco as kharisiri, or ñakaq, or lik'ichiri in the Aymara language.

Legend and its effects
According to folklore, a pishtaco is an evil monster-like creature—often a stranger and often a white man—who seeks out unsuspecting natives to kill them and abuse them in many ways. The legend dates back to the Spanish conquest of South America . Primarily, his method of killing is stealing his victims' body fat for various cannibalistic purposes, or cutting them up and selling their flesh as fried chicharrones. Pishtaco derives from the local Quechua-language word "pishtay" which means to "behead, cut the throat, or cut into slices".

The preoccupation with body fat has a long tradition in the Andes region. Pre-Hispanic natives prized fat so much that a deity, Viracocha (meaning sea of fat), existed for it. It is also natural for the peasant rural poor to view fleshiness and excess body fat as the very sign of life, good health, strength and beauty. Many illnesses are thought to have their roots in the loss of body fats, and skeletal thinness is abhorred. With this, the conquistadores' practice of treating their wounds with their enemies' corpse fats horrified the natives. Spaniards are also said to have killed natives and boiled their corpses to produce fat to grease their metal muskets and cannons, which rusted quickly in the humid Amazon.

Andean Aboriginals feared Spanish missionaries as pishtacos, believing the missionaries were killing people for fat, thereafter oiling church bells to make them especially sonorous. In modern times, similar beliefs held that sugar mill machinery needed human fat as grease, or that jet aircraft engines could not start without a bit of human fat.

Pishtaco beliefs have affected international assistance programs, e.g. leading to rejection of the US Food for Peace program by several communities, out of fears that the real purpose was to fatten children and later exploit them for their fat. Natives have attacked survey geologists working on the Peruvian and Bolivian altiplano, because they believed that the geologists were pishtacos. The work of anthropologists has been stymied because measurements of fat folds were rumoured to be part of a plot to select the fattest individuals later to be targeted by pishtacos. In 2009, the pishtaco legend was cited as a possible contributory factor in the apparent fabrication of a story by Peruvian police of a gang murdering up to 60 people to harvest their fat.

In popular culture
The pishtaco is prominently referenced in the novel Death in the Andes by Mario Vargas Llosa. In the book, two members of the Peruvian Civil Guard investigate the disappearance of three men, trying to determine if they were killed by the Shining Path guerilla group or by mythical monsters.

Pishtacos were primary plot source drivers and antagonists in the ninth season episode "The Purge" of the TV series Supernatural. This version of the Pishtaco have a lamprey-like appendage emitted from their mouth which feeds off fat. A human male marries a pishtaco female and the two start a weight-loss retreat so the female could sustain herself while helping those who wished to lose weight only for her brother to decide that he preferred killing those he fed from. A minor running gag was the near homophony of the word "pishtaco" with the phrase "fish taco". The male pishtaco is killed by Sam and Dean Winchester and the female pishtaco is given a one-way ticket back to Peru.

Pishtacos are also featured in the Gail Carriger novel Competence, the third book in her Custard Protocol series. The crew of the Spotted Custard travel to the Peruvian Andes in search of a supposed newly discovered breed of vampire that is on the verge of extinction. The pishtacos in this story are described as being very tall, incredibly thin, shock-white haired, and red eyed with a single columnar tooth for fat-sucking instead of the traditional elongated canine teeth of vampires for blood-sucking. This appearance is a result of the transformation from human to pishtaco. The pishtacos in this story also feed on fat.

Pishtaco play a prominent role in the 2018 edition of the Call of Cthulhu adventure module, Masks of Nyarlathotep, where their mythology is linked to the Lovecraftian entity, Nyarlathotep.

Pishtacos also appear as minor supporting characters in the first novel of Josh Erikson's Ethereal Earth series, Hero Forged.

In Shadow of the Tomb Raider, the pishtacos appear as mythical creatures who hunt the organization of Trinity.

Pishtacos affair
The pishtacos affair was an incident in November 2009 in which the National Police of Peru alleged that Peruvian gangsters had murdered as many as 60 people for their fat, and sold it to intermediaries in Lima, who then sold the fat to laboratories in Europe for use in cosmetics. The name for the gang, "pishtacos," as well as the details of the alleged criminal plot, played on the Latin American urban legend of the pishtaco.

The lurid story was "quickly questioned," and by December had been revealed as a hoax. General Felix Murga, the "head of the national police's criminal-investigation division," was placed on leave on December 1, 2009. Former government official Carlos Basombrío Iglesias accused Murga (and others) of devising the hoax specifically to distract the media from a recent press release accusing police in Trujillo, Peru, of extrajudicial killings circa 2007–2008.

Details of the hoax
According to the police, the first suspected gang members, Serapio Marcos and Enedina Estela, were arrested on November 3, 2009. Elmer Segundo Castillejos was arrested on November 6. Police at one point claimed that they were searching for six additional members of the gang, including an alleged ringleader, Hilario Cudena, who "has been killing to extract fat from victims for more than three decades," and two Italian nationals.

The story was that the gang members severed victims' heads, arms and legs, removed their organs, and suspended the carcasses from hooks above candles, which caused the fat to drip into tubs below. The gang then allegedly sold the fat at a price of $15,000 per liter — but medical experts cast doubt on that, saying that so much body fat is extracted in routine medical procedures such as liposuction that there should not be such a high demand for it.

See also
 Lik'ichiri
 Blood libel

Notes

Sources

External links

Pishtaco texts in Quechua
 S. Hernán AGUILAR: Kichwa kwintukuna patsaatsinan. AMERINDIA n°25, 2000. Pishtaku 1, Pishtaku 2 (in Ancash Quechua, with Spanish translation)
 RUNASIMI.de: Nakaq (Nak'aq). Wañuchisqanmanta wirata tukuchinkus rimidyuman. Recorded by Alejandro Ortiz Rescaniere in 1971, told by Aurelia Lizame (25 years old), comunidad de Wankarama / Huancarama, provincia de Andahuaylas, departamento del Apurímac. Alejandro Ortiz Rescaniere, De Adaneva  Inkarri: una visión indígena del Perú. Lima, 1973. pp. 164–165 (in Chanka Quechua).

Cannibalism in South America
Multiracial affairs in South America
Quechua legendary creatures
Aymara legendary creatures
Peruvian culture
Race in Latin America
Peruvian folklore
Bogeymen
Stereotypes of white men